Mark Bone (born 1960) is a New Zealander swimming instructor and former national coach. He served as the national swimming coach from 1990 to 1996. Under him, New Zealand's swimming program saw its most successful period, with a win at the 1995 FINA World Short Course Swimming Championship in the 4x100 metre medley relay and Danyon Loader's (New Zealand's sole Olympic swimming champion) double gold in the 200 and 400 metre freestyle at the 1996 Olympic Games in Atlanta. He has also coached triathletes Hamish Carter and Bevan Docherty, who won gold and silver respectively in the men's triathlon at the 2004 Olympic Games in Athens.

References

People from Hastings, New Zealand
Victoria University of Wellington alumni
Living people
1960 births
People educated at Hastings Boys' High School
New Zealand Olympic coaches
New Zealand swimming coaches